The 1952 World Table Tennis Championships men's singles was the 19th edition of the men's singles championship. 

Hiroji Satoh defeated József Kóczián in the final, winning three sets to nil to secure the title.

Results

See also
List of World Table Tennis Championships medalists

References

-